Duaa or Dua (English: Prayer) is a Pakistani television drama serial written by Wasiq Ali and directed by Ali Faizan. It stars Ushna Shah, Junaid Khan and Daniyal Raheel in lead roles. The drama debuted on 5 August 2015 on Geo Entertainment, where it aired every Wednesday and Thursday at 9:00 P.M.

The drama is based upon the youth of our society who take major and hasty life decisions passionately without thinking how it is going to affect their lives. Such people face regret and guilt their whole lives over their decisions. Duaa focuses on such issues, it revolves around the life of four friends Javeria, Ashar, Shees and Anusha who were living happily after their marriages but due to one wrong decision, the life of these people becomes difficult.

Story
Dua, a poverty-stricken girl lives with her mother was in love with Ashar who belonged to affluent family from internal village. Ashar's family was against Dua and Ashar marriage but Ashar went beyond his family limits and marry Dua. Therefore, couple had to live by the efforts of their own.

On the other hand, Ashar's friend Murtaza was marrying Anoushey, her love. Both belonged to well known families in the town. The turning point came in Dua's life when Ashar in extreme anger took nasty and nonsense major life decision by divorcing her at the spot.
Later Ashar felt guilt and regret over his foolish decision. He requested his friend Murtaza to marry Dua to make her halala.

Cast
Ushna Shah as Dua
Junaid Khan as Murtaza
Daniyal Raheel as Ashar
Manzoor Qureshi as Murtaza's father
Hina Khawaja Bayat as Dua's mother (dead) 
Zainab Ahmed as Anoushey

References

External links
Duaa On Geo Entertainment
Geo TV official twitter page

2015 Pakistani television series debuts
Pakistani drama television series
Urdu-language television shows